Levi Morgan (born 26 June 1766 in Morgantown, West Virginia) was a West Virginian pioneer. His grandfather was Colonel Morgan Morgan, a Welshman who was the first white settler in the hills of West Virginia, and his father was Colonel Zackquill Morgan. The Morgans were merchants and wealthy landowners. Levi grew up around the Delaware Indians and spoke their language, but took part in many Indian wars including one in Marion County, West Virginia. Levi was found frozen to death in Kentucky in 1825. A statue to him stands in the mid Ohio valley town of New Martinsville, Wetzel County, West Virginia.

External links
Levi Morgan The West Virginia Biographies Project, 2007

1766 births
1825 deaths
American people of Welsh descent
West Virginia pioneers
Morgan family of West Virginia
People from Morgantown, West Virginia
West Virginia colonial people
People of pre-statehood West Virginia